The 2nd Empire Awards ceremony, presented by the British film magazine Empire, honored the best films of 1996 and took place on 5 March 1997 at the Park Lane Hotel in London, England. During the ceremony, Empire presented Empire Awards in nine categories as well as two honorary awards. The award for Best British Director and the honorary Empire Inspiration Award were first introduced this year. The awards were sponsored by Miller Brewing Company.

Trainspotting won the most awards with four including Best British Film, Best British Director for Danny Boyle and Best British Actor for Ewan McGregor. Other winners included Seven with two awards including Best Film and 12 Monkeys, Fargo and Secrets & Lies with one. The Monty Python team received the Empire Inspiration Award and Freddie Francis received the Lifetime Achievement Award.

Winners and nominees
Winners are listed first and highlighted in boldface.

Multiple awards
The following two films received multiple awards:

References

External links
 

Empire Award ceremonies
1996 film awards
1997 in British cinema

1997 in London
March 1997 events in the United Kingdom